Portishead or Portishead and North Weston is a civil parish in North Somerset, England. The parish includes the coastal town of Portishead along with the village of North Weston. The 2011 census gave the population as 23,699. As of 2017 however, the population number is estimated to be well over 25,000 with another 8,000 people expected by 2026.

Governance

The town council has responsibility for local issues, including setting an annual precept (local rate) to cover the council's operating costs and producing annual accounts for public scrutiny. The parish council evaluates local planning applications and works with the local police, district council officers, and neighbourhood watch groups on matters of crime, security, and traffic. The parish council's role also includes initiating projects for the maintenance and repair of parish facilities, such as the village hall or community centre, playing fields and playgrounds, as well as consulting with the district council on the maintenance, repair, and improvement of highways, drainage, footpaths, public transport, and street cleaning.

The parish falls within the unitary authority of North Somerset which was created in 1996, as established by the Local Government Act 1992. It provides a single tier of local government with responsibility for almost all local government functions within their area including local planning and building control, local roads, council housing, environmental health, markets and fairs, refuse collection, recycling, cemeteries, crematoria, leisure services, parks, and tourism. They are also responsible for education, social services, libraries, main roads, public transport, trading standards, waste disposal and strategic planning.

North Somerset's area covers part of the ceremonial county of Somerset but it is administered independently of the non-metropolitan county. Its administrative headquarters are in the town hall in Weston-super-Mare. The parish is part of the North Somerset county constituency of the House of Commons. It has been represented since 1992 by Liam Fox, a member of the Conservative Party. It was also part of the South West England constituency of the European Parliament prior to Britain leaving the European Union in January 2020.

History
North Weston was historically a hamlet in the parish of Portishead. It was created a separate civil parish in 1894.

Between 1 April 1974 and 1 April 1996, both parishes were in the Woodspring district of the county of Avon. Before 1974 the parishes were part of the Long Ashton Rural District and Portishead Urban District.

The two parishes were united in 1993, and the united parish became part of North Somerset in 1996.

References

External links
Town Council

Civil parishes in Somerset
Portishead, Somerset